The United States House of Representatives elections in Washington were held on November 2, 2004. Washington has nine members in the House of Representatives, as apportioned during the 2000 Census, and all nine seats were up for re-election. There were two open seats in the 5th and 8th districts when Republicans George Nethercutt and Jennifer Dunn, respectively, retired. No seats changed party this year.

Overview

District 1

In this liberal-leaning district based in the northern suburbs of Seattle and parts of the Kitsap Peninsula, incumbent Democratic Congressman Jay Inslee did not face a serious challenge from Republican candidate Randy Eastwood and Libertarian Charles Moore. Congressman Inslee was able to crush both candidates in the general election to win his fifth nonconsecutive term in Congress.

District 2

Incumbent Congressman Rick Larsen has represented this Western Washington district, which extends from the northern and western suburbs of Seattle to the Canada–US border in the north since he was first elected in 2000. This year, he was challenge by Republican Suzanne Sinclair and Libertarian Bruce Guthrie, but he was easily able to win a third term due to the liberal nature of his constituency.

District 3

This Western Washington district, which spans from Olympia to the Washington-Oregon border, has a moderate profile and has been represented by Democratic Congressman Brian Baird since 1999. Seeking a fourth term, Baird was opposed by Republican Thomas Crowson, but the Congressman’s popularity allowed him to crush his opponent in a landslide.

District 4

Incumbent Republican Congressman Doc Hastings, who won his first term in 1994 by defeating fellow Congressman Jay Inslee, ran for a sixth term in this conservative, central Washington-based district. Hastings faced Democratic nominee Sandy Matheson in the general election, whom he was able to defeat convincingly.

District 5

When incumbent Republican Congressman George Nethercutt opted to run for Senate instead of seeking a sixth term, an open seat was created. The Minority Leader of the Washington House of Representatives, Cathy McMorris, emerged as the Republican nominee, while Don Barbieri, a well-known developer based in Spokane became the Democratic nominee. McMorris was able to defeat Barbieri by a wide margin to win her first term in Congress.

District 6

Congressman Norm Dicks, the dean of the Washington congressional delegation, sought a fifteenth term in this liberal-leaning district based on the Kitsap Peninsula. Dicks faced perennial candidate and conservative activist Doug Cloud in the general election, but he was able to trump Cloud to seal another term in Congress.

District 7

Incumbent Democratic Congressman Jim McDermott, who has represented this solidly liberal district based in Seattle since he was first elected in 1988, ran for an eighth term in 2004. Facing Republican candidate Carol Cassady, McDermott was able to easily take victory, winning by the largest margin out of any Congressman that year in his state.

District 8

Incumbent Republican Congresswoman Jennifer Dunn declined to seek a seventh term in this increasingly liberal district based in the eastern suburbs of Seattle and encompassing much of King County. King County Sheriff Dave Reichert became the Republican nominee. The Democratic primary attracted national attention with three major candidates: Heidi Behrens-Benedict, the Democratic nominee for the congressional seat in 1998, 2000, and 2002; former RealNetworks attorney Alex Alben; and KIRO radio host Dave Ross. Ross won the primary and ran as the Democratic nominee. Despite a grueling battle and the fact that the Democratic nominee for President, John Kerry, won the district that year, Reichert managed to pull out a thin victory and went to Congress for his first term.

District 9

This district has been represented by Democratic Congressman Adam Smith since he was first elected in 1996. Covering the densely populated area from the suburbs of Seattle to the northern portion of Olympia, the district has a moderately liberal population with a tendency to support Democratic candidates. Congressman Smith  did not face a serious challenge from Republican Paul Lord and Green Party candidate Robert Posey and was re-elected to a fifth term with ease.

References

See also

Washington
2004
2004 Washington (state) elections